Peter Michael Meloy (born October 26, 1942) is an American politician in the state of Montana. He served in the Montana House of Representatives from 1975 to 1979. In 1977, he served as majority leader of the House. He is a lawyer.

References

1942 births
Living people
Politicians from Helena, Montana
University of California, Riverside alumni
University of Montana alumni
Montana lawyers
Democratic Party members of the Montana House of Representatives